The Cross of the Warsaw Uprising was an informal award used by soldiers of the Polish resistance during the Warsaw Uprising of 1944. It consisted of a captured German Iron Cross, with a pre-war 1 złoty coin pinned to it in the centre over the swastika; the reverse side of the coin, showing the Polish eagle, was displayed, to which was added a kotwica and the inscription "1944". It was awarded for killing an SS officer in combat and made during quieter periods in between the fighting.

This cross should not be confused with the Warsaw Uprising Cross (Warszawski Krzyż Powstańczy) established in 1981.

See also
 Warsaw Uprising
 Home Army
 Polish resistance movement in World War II
 Polish contribution to World War II
 Operation Tempest
 Wola massacre
 Ochota massacre
 Robinson Crusoes of Warsaw
 Warsaw Insurgents Cemetery
 Warsaw Uprising Museum
 Warsaw Uprising Monument
 Little Insurgent Monument
 Monument to Victims of the Wola Massacre

References

Polish campaign medals
Warsaw Uprising